San Barnaba is a Baroque architecture, Roman Catholic parish church in Modena, Italy. 

Construction of the present church began in 1660, on the site of a former church from the 10th century. It underwent restoration in 1838. The ceiling has framed paintings by Sigismondo Caula and Jacopo Antonio Manini.

References

Roman Catholic churches in Modena
Baroque architecture in Modena
17th-century Roman Catholic church buildings in Italy
10th-century establishments in Italy
1660 establishments in Italy